Rhododendron colemanii, the Red Hills azalea, is a species of Rhododendron native to the upper coastal plain of Alabama and western Georgia in the United States.  This species was previously confused with Rhododendron alabamense and its hybrids, but was distinguished by DNA sequencing.

References

colemanii
Flora of the Southeastern United States
Flora without expected TNC conservation status